This is a list of International Congresses of Mathematicians Plenary and Invited Speakers. Being invited to talk at an International Congress of Mathematicians has been called "the equivalent, in this community, of an induction to a hall of fame." The current list of Plenary and Invited Speakers presented here is based on the ICM's post-WW II terminology, in which the one-hour speakers in the morning sessions are called "Plenary Speakers" and the other speakers (in the afternoon sessions) whose talks are included in the ICM published proceedings are called "Invited Speakers". In the pre-WW II congresses the Plenary Speakers were called "Invited Speakers".

By congress year

1897, Zürich

Jules Andrade
Léon Autonne
Émile Borel
N. V. Bougaïev
Francesco Brioschi
Hermann Brunn
Cesare Burali-Forti
Charles Jean de la Vallée Poussin
Gustaf Eneström
Federigo Enriques
Gino Fano
Zoel García de Galdeano
Francesco Gerbaldi
Paul Gordan
Jacques Hadamard
Adolf Hurwitz
Felix Klein
Gino Loria
Wilhelm Franz Meyer
Giuseppe Peano
Ivan Pervushin
Émile Picard
Salvatore Pincherle
Henri Poincaré
Gusztáv Rados

Theodor Reye
Ernst Schröder
Cyparissos Stephanos
Ludwig Stickelberger
Aurel Stodola
H. Weber
Hieronymus Georg Zeuthen
Nikolay Yegorovich Zhukovsky

1900, Paris

During the 1900 Congress in Paris, France, David Hilbert (pictured) announced his famous list of Hilbert's problems.

Federico Amodeo
Léon Autonne
Ivar Otto Bendixson
Jean Boccardi
Émile Borel
Moritz Cantor
Alfredo Capelli
Élie Cartan
Philbert Maurice d'Ocagne
Zoel García de Galdeano
Leonard Eugene Dickson
Jules Drach
Erik Ivar Fredholm
Rikitaro Fujisawa
Ángel Gallardo
Jacques Hadamard
Harris Hancock
David Hilbert
Pierre Adolphe Issaly
Eugen Jahnke
Victor Jamet
Léopold Leau
Edgar Odell Lovett
Charles Méray
Alexander Macfarlane

Artemas Martin
Gösta Mittag-Leffler
Henri Padé
Alessandro Padoa

Henri Poincaré
Cyparissos Stephanos
Irving Stringham

F. J. Vaes
Giuseppe Veronese
Vito Volterra
Helge von Koch

1904, Heidelberg

Jules Andrade
Léon Autonne
Anton Börsch
Émile Borel
Pierre Boutroux
Max Brückner
Anton von Braunmühl
Alexander von Brill
Moritz Cantor
Alfredo Capelli
Nikolai Delaunay
Samuel Dickstein
Gustaf Eneström
Henri Fehr
Johannes Finsterbusch
Sebastian Finsterwalder
Robert Fricke
Robert William Genese
Paul Gordan
Alfred George Greenhill

Alf Victor Guldberg
August Gutzmer
Jacques Hadamard
David Hilbert
Franc Hočevar
Gyula Kőnig (Julius König)
Alfred Kempe
Felix Klein
Johannes Knoblauch
Leo Königsberger
Tullio Levi-Civita

Alfred Loewy
Gino Loria
Francis Sowerby Macaulay
Wilhelm Franz Meyer
Hermann Minkowski
Gösta Mittag-Leffler
Emil Müller
Paul Painlevé
Ludwig Prandtl
Karl Rohn
Georg Scheffers
Ludwig Schlesinger
Arthur Moritz Schoenflies
Heinrich Schotten
Corrado Segre
Maximilian Simon
Arnold Sommerfeld
Antonín Václav Šourek
Paul Stäckel
Cyparissos Stéphanos
Eduard Study
Heinrich Suter
Paul Tannery

Giovanni Vailati
Vito Volterra
Georgy Voronoy
Heinrich Martin Weber
Julius Weingarten
Hermann Wiener
Ernest Julius Wilczynski
Edwin Bidwell Wilson
Anders Wiman
Wilhelm Wirtinger
Hieronymus Georg Zeuthen

1908, Rome

Max Abraham
Federico Amodeo
Jules Andrade
Friedrich Simon Archenhold
Léon Autonne
Giuseppe Bagnera
Emanuel Beke
Felix Bernstein
Luigi Bianchi
Giovanni Boccardi
Tommaso Boggio
Georg Bohlmann
Émile Borel
Pierre Boutroux
Max Brückner
L. E. J. Brouwer
George H. Bryan
Silvio Canevazzi
Alfredo Capelli
Giuseppe Casazza
Thomas Claxton Fidler
:it:Alberto Conti

Maurice d'Ocagne
Gaston Darboux
George Darwin
Miles Menander Dawson
Michele de Franchis
Zoel García de Galdeano
Fernando de Helguero
Leonard Eugene Dickson
Friedrich Dingeldey
Pierre Duhem
Walther von Dyck
William Palin Elderton
Arnold Emch
Federigo Enriques
Henri Fehr
Johannes Finsterbusch
Andrew Forsyth
Giovanni Frattini
Ivar Fredholm
Guido Fubini
Generoso Gallucci
Antonio Garbasso
Robert William Genese
Raffaele Giacomelli
Corrado Gini
Paul Gordan
George Greenhill
August Gutzmer
Jacques Hadamard
Gerhard Hessenberg
Gregorius Itelson
Paul Koebe
G. V. Kolosoff
Arthur Korn
Traian Lalesco
Horace Lamb
Giuseppe Lauricella
Charles Lembourg
Beppo Levi
Tullio Levi-Civita
Hendrik Lorentz
Gino Loria
Luigi Luiggi
Alexander Macfarlane
Lucien March
Roberto Marcolongo
Gösta Mittag-Leffler
Domenico Montesano
Robert de Montessus de Ballore
E. H. Moore
Simon Newcomb
Onorato Nicoletti
Max Noether
Luciano Orlando
Marino Pannelli
Ernesto Pascal
Annibale Pastore
Mihailo Petrović
Georgii Pfeiffer
Émile Picard
Georg Pick
Salvatore Pincherle
Laura Pisati
Giulio Pittarelli
Paolo Pizzetti
Henri Poincaré
John Henry Poynting
Giuseppe Pucciano
Albert Quiquet
Gusztáv Rados
Georges Rémoundos
Frigyes Riesz

Ludwig Schlesinger
Corrado Segre
Francesco Severi
Carlo Severini
Maximilian Simon
David Eugene Smith
Carlo Somigliana
Arnold Sommerfeld
Cyparissos Stéphanos
Carl Størmer

George F. Swain
Orazio Tedone
Guido Toja
Gheorghe Tzitzéica
Giovanni Vailati
Vladimir Varićak
Giuseppe Veronese
Vito Volterra
William Henry Young
Stanisław Zaremba
Ernst Zermelo

Hieronymus Georg Zeuthen

1912, Cambridge (UK)

Max Abraham
Luigi Amoroso
Maxime Bôcher
Harry Bateman
Hans Albrecht von Beckh-Widmanstetter
Geoffrey Thomas Bennett
Sergei Natanovich Bernstein
Wilhelm Blaschke
Otto Blumenthal
Enrico Bompiani
Émile Borel
Max Brückner
Selig Brodetsky
Thomas John I'Anson Bromwich
L. E. J. Brouwer
Ernest William Brown
George Edward St. Lawrence Carson
Henry Louis Le Châtelier

John Dougall
Jules Drach
Walther von Dyck
Francis Ysidro Edgeworth
Luther P. Eisenhart
Edwin Bailey Elliott
Gustaf Eneström
Federigo Enriques
Paul Peter Ewald
Ludwig Föppl
Henri Fehr
John Charles Fields
Johannes Finsterbusch
André Gérardin
Marcel Grossmann
Jacques Hadamard
Johann Georg Hagen
Percy John Harding
G. H. Hardy
Nikolaos J. Hatzidakis
Micaiah John Muller Hill
Bohuslav Hostinský
Hilda Phoebe Hudson
Edward Vermilye Huntington
Gregorius Itelson
Zygmunt Janiszewski
Philip Jourdain
Theodore von Kármán
Dénes Kőnig
József Kürschák
Edward Kasner
Helge von Koch
Horace Lamb
Joseph Larmor
Edmund Landau
Robert Alfred Lehfeldt
Armin Otto Leuschner
John Edensor Littlewood
Gino Loria
Augustus Edward Hough Love
Alexander Macfarlane
E. H. Moore
Frank Morley
Forest Ray Moulton
Robert Franklin Muirhead
Eric Harold Neville
Thomas Percy Nunn
Alessandro Padoa
Giuseppe Peano
William Peddie
Johannes Hendrikus Peek
Mihailo Petrovitch
Albert Quiquet
Georges Rémoundos
Ferdinand Rudio
Carl David Tolmé Runge

Ralph Allen Sampson
Ludwig Schlesinger
Pieter Hendrik Schoute
William Fleetwood Sheppard
Ludwik Silberstein
David Eugene Smith
Marian Smoluchowski
Carlo Somigliana
Duncan Sommerville
Johan Frederik Steffensen
Cyparissos Stéphanos

Eduard Study

Esteban Terrades
J. J. Thomson
Herbert Hall Turner
Gheorghe Tzitzéica
Giovanni Vacca
Vito Volterra
Roland Weitzenböck
Alfred North Whitehead
E. T. Whittaker
Michael Marlow Umfreville Wilkinson
Ernst Zermelo

1920, Strasbourg

Johan Antony Barrau
Jean Boccardi

Pierre Boutroux
Louis Marcel Brillouin
Henri Brocard
Bohumil Bydzowsky
Élie Cartan
Albert Châtelet
Francisco Miranda da Costa Lobo
Percy John Daniell
Maurice d'Ocagne
Théophile de Donder
Arnaud Denjoy
Jacques Deruyts
Leonard Eugene Dickson
Jules Drach
L. Gustave du Pasquier
Luther P. Eisenhart
Rudolf Fueter
André Gérardin
Alfred George Greenhill
Marcel Grossmann
Édouard Guillaume
Alf Victor Guldberg
Jacques Hadamard
Nikolaos J. Hatzidakis
Bohuslav Hostinský
Camille Jordan
Gabriel Koenigs
Joseph Larmor
Solomon Lefschetz
Louis Maillard
Niels Erik Nørlund
Kinnosuke Ogura
František Rádl
Georges Rémoundos
Julio Rey Pastor
Dimitri Riabouchinsky

Émile Schwoerer

Carl Størmer
Simion Stoilow
Teiji Takagi

Georges Valiron
Charles Jean de la Vallée-Poussin
Henri Louis Vanderlinden
Theodoros Varopoulos
Vito Volterra
Joseph Leonard Walsh
Rolin Wavre
Pierre Weiss
Norbert Wiener
William Henry Young
Stanisław Zaremba

1924, Toronto

Jules Andrade
Robert W. Angus
R. W. Bailey
Johan Antony Barrau
Louis Agricola Bauer
Eric Temple Bell
Benjamin Abram Bernstein
Abram Besicovitch
Richard Birkeland
Vilhelm Bjerknes
Gilbert Ames Bliss
Tommy Bonnesen
Ettore Bortolotti
Arthur Lyon Bowley
Louis Charles Breguet
Lyman James Briggs
Léon Brillouin
Ernest William Brown
Daniel Buchanan
Bohumil Bydzovsky  	
Florian Cajori
George Ashley Campbell
John Renshaw Carson
Élie Cartan
Sydney Chapman
Prosper Charbonnier
Jean Chazy
Robert H. Coats
Arthur Byron Coble
B. M. Coïalowitsch
Ernest George Coker
Arthur W. Conway
Patrick Peter Cormack
Francisco Miranda da Costa Lobo
Louis Jacques Crelier
Louise Duffield Cummings
David Raymond Curtiss
Haroutune Mugurditch Dadourian
Boris Delaunay

Leonard Eugene Dickson
Alfred Cardew Dixon
Jules Drach
L. Gustave du Pasquier
Herbert Bristol Dwight
Arthur Eddington
John Arndt Eiesland
William Palin Elderton
Alfred Errera
Griffith Conrad Evans
Henri Fehr
Grigorii Fichtenholz
John Charles Fields
Ronald Fisher
Arthur Percy Morris Fleming
Walter Burton Ford
R. M. Foster
Ralph H. Fowler
Maurice Fréchet
Thornton Carle Fry
Guido Fubini
Rudolf Fueter
William Frederick Gerhardt

Albert Henry Stewart Gillson
Corrado Gini
Giovanni Giorgi
Oliver Edmunds Glenn
James Waterman Glover
Lucien Godeaux
James Gordon Gray
Alfred George Greenhill
Jules Haag
Bernard Parker Haigh
Mellen Woodman Haskell
Olive Clio Hazlett
Nicholas Hunter Heck
Earle Raymond Hedrick
James Blacklock Henderson
Robert Henderson
Einar Hille
G. W. O. Howe
William Jackson Humphreys
F. R. W. Hunt
John Irwin Hutchinson
Samuel Jacob Jacobsohn
Maurice Janet
Charles Frewen Jenkin

Louis Charles Karpinski
Arthur Edwin Kennelly
Cassius Jackson Keyser
Louis Vessot King
Gabriel Koenigs
Alfred Korzybski

Mikhail Kravchuk
Nikolay Mitrofanovich Krylov
Joseph Larmor
Jean-Marie Le Roux
Horace Clifford Levinson
Cristóbal de Losada y Puga
Murdoch Campbell MacLean
Percy Alexander MacMahon
Lucien March
George Francis McEwen
Émile Merlin
George Abram Miller
Edward C. Molina
Frank Morley
Francis Dominic Murnaghan
Forrest Hamilton Murray
Øystein Ore
Charles Algernon Parsons
John Patterson
Giuseppe Peano
Mihailo Petrovitch
Lars Edvard Phragmén
James P. Pierpont
Salvatore Pincherle
Michel Plancherel
Henry Crozier Plummer
Jean-Baptiste Pomey
Gorakh Prasad
Umberto Puppini
C. V. Raman
Andrea Razmadze
Lowell J. Reed
Gregorio Ricci-Curbastro
Paul Reece Rider
Henry Louis Rietz
René Risser
Joseph Fels Ritt
William Henry Roever
James Harvey Rogers
Thomas Reeve Rosebrugh
Charles Edward St. John
Axel Frey Samsioe
Pio Scatizzi
Clément Servais
Francesco Severi
Napier Shaw
William Fleetwood Sheppard
James Alexander Shohat
Wacław Sierpiński
Ludwik Silberstein
Chester Snow
Carl Størmer
Johan Frederik Steffensen
Vladimir Steklov
Charles Thompson Sullivan
William Francis Gray Swann
John Lighton Synge
Jacob Tamarkin
D'Arcy Wentworth Thompson
Leonida Tonelli
Jacques Touchard
Gheorghe Tzitzéica
J. V. Uspensky
Willem van der Woude
Henri Louis Vanderlinden
Harry Schultz Vandiver
Theodoros Varopoulos
John Alexander Low Waddell
James Henry Weaver
A. Harry Wheeler

Albert Wurts Whitney
Raymond Louis Wilder
Thomas Russell Wilkins
Walter Francis Willcox
William Lloyd Garrison Williams
Edwin Bidwell Wilson
Hugh Herbert Wolfenden
Julius Wolff
William Henry Young
George Udny Yule
Stanisław Zaremba

1928, Bologna

Nicholas Wladimir Akimoff
Giacomo Albanese
Giuseppe Albenga
Pavel Alexandrov
Luigi Amoroso

Raymond Clare Archibald
Emilio Artom
José Babini
Richard Baldus
Stefan Banach
Paul Jean Joseph Barbarin
Nina Bary
Sergei Natanovich Bernstein
Ludwig Berwald
Cornelis Benjamin Biezeno

George David Birkhoff
Juan Blaquier
Wilhelm Blaschke
André Blondel
Harald Bohr
Enrico Bompiani
Tommy Bonnesen
Émile Borel
Enea Bortolotti
Ettore Bortolotti

Max Brückner
Louis Marcel Brillouin
Ugo Broggi
Thomas John I'Anson Bromwich
Daniel Buchanan
Adolphe Buhl

Bohumil Bydzowsky
Angelina Cabras
Renato Caccioppoli
Giacomo Candido
Francesco Paolo Cantelli
Élie Cartan
Giuseppe Casazza

Guido Castelnuovo
Ettore Cavalli
Eduard Čech
Jean Chazy

P'ei-Yuan Chou
Leon Chwistek
Louis Crelier
Stephan Cohn-Vossen
Richard Courant
Georges Darmois
Boris Delaunay
Bruno de Finetti
Béla Kerékjártó
Paul Clément Delens

Alfred Cardew Dixon
Wilhelm Dobbernack
Jules Drach
L. Gustave du Pasquier

Arnold Emch
Federigo Enriques
Gino Fano
Luigi Fantappiè
John Charles Fields
Ronald Fisher
Paul Flamant
Maurice Fréchet
Abraham Fraenkel
Guido Fubini
Rudolf Fueter
André Gérardin

Oliver Edmunds Glenn
Lucien Godeaux
Stanisław Gołąb
Ferdinand Gonseth
Aleksander Grużewski
Alf Victor Guldberg
Emil Julius Gumbel
Nikolai Günther
Alfréd Haar
Jacques Hadamard
Hasso Härlen

Mellen Woodman Haskell
Nikolaos J. Hatzidakis
Olive Hazlett
Poul Heegaard
Heinrich Hencky
David Hilbert
Václav Hlavatý
Bohuslav Hostinský
William Hovgaard
Pierre Humbert

Christian Juel
Gaston Maurice Julia
Gustave Juvet
Theodore von Kármán
Gottfried Köthe
Stefan Kaczmarz
Sōichi Kakeya
Joseph Kampé de Fériet
Jovan Karamata
Louis Charles Karpinski
Edward Kasner
Bronislaw Knaster
Paul Koebe
G. V. Kolosoff
Mikhail Kravchuk
Nikolay Mitrofanovich Krylov
Rodion Kuzmin
Paul Pierre Lévy
Joseph Larmor
Mikhail Lavrentieff
Franciszek Leja
Marcello Lelli
Josef Lennertz
Jean-Marie Le Roux
Tullio Levi-Civita
Harry Levy
Hans Lewy
Leon Lichtenstein

Gino Loria
Jan Łukasiewicz
Nicolas Lusin
Lazar Aronovich Lusternik
Giorgina Madia

Szolem Mandelbrojt
Lucien March
Roberto Marcolongo

Pierre Massé
Stefan Mazurkiewicz
Albert Joseph McConnell
Birger Meidell

Karl Menger
Dmitrii Menshov
Paul Mentré
Augustin Mesnage
Wilhelm Franz Meyer
Gaspare Mignosi
L. M. Milne-Thomson
Edward Charles Molina
Johannes Mollerup
Louis J. Mordell
Francis D. Murnaghan
Pekka Juhana Myrberg
Trygve Nagell
Pia Nalli
Otto E. Neugebauer
Rolf Nevanlinna
Jerzy Neyman

Otto M. Nikodym
Vittorio Nobile
Emmy Noether
Niels Erik Norlund
Nikola Obrechkoff
Octav Onicescu
Øystein Ore
Alessandro Padoa
C. Papaioannou

Mario Pascal
Oskar Perron
Mihailo Petrovitch
Georgii Pfeiffer
Mauro Picone
Salvatore Pincherle

Michel Plancherel
George Arthur Plimpton
George Pólya

Umberto Puppini
Gorakh Prasad
Albert Quiquet
Tibor Radó
Hans Rademacher
George Yuri Rainich
Kurt Reidemeister
Julio Rey Pastor
Dimitri Riabouchinsky
Frigyes Riesz
René Risser
Vsevolod Ivanovich Romanovsky

Alberto E. Sagastume Berra

Stanislaw Saks
Gustavo Sannia
Giovanni Sansone
Francesco Sbrana
Gerrit Schaake
Emil Schoenbaum
Jan Arnoldus Schouten
Beniamino Segre
Francesco Severi

Wacław Sierpiński
Louis Lazarus Silverman
Charles Herschel Sisam
Eugen Slutsky
James John Smith

Virgil Snyder
Carlo Somigliana
Andreas Speiser

Hugo Steinhaus
Alexander William Stern
Simion Stoilow
Ellis Bagley Stouffer
Paolo Straneo

Otto Szász
Ralph Tambs Lyche
Alfred Tarski

Gerhard Thomsen
Georges César Tiercy
Stephen Timoshenko
it:Sebastiano Timpanaro
Leonida Tonelli

Francesco Tricomi
Herbert Westren Turnbull
Friedrich Maria Urban
R. Vaidyanathaswamy
Georges Valiron
Henri Louis Vanderlinden
Vladimir Varićak
Oswald Veblen

Tirukkannapuram Vijayaraghavan
Giuseppe Vitali

Vito Volterra

Gheorghe Vranceanu
Alwin Walther
Gleb Wataghin
Rolin Wavre
Alexander Weinstein
Hermann Weyl
E. T. Whittaker
Sven Dag Wicksell
Dorothy Wrinch
William Henry Young
Oscar Zariski

Ziauddin Ahmad

Antoni Zygmund
Eustachy Żyliński

1932, Zürich

Clarence Raymond Adams
Lars Valerian Ahlfors
M. Akimoff
James Waddell Alexander
P. Alexandroff
Franz Alt
Luigi Amoroso
Arschanikoff

Giuseppe Belardinelli
C. Belhôte
Maurits Joost Belinfante
Stefan Bergman
Paul Bernays
Sergei Bernstein
Ludwig Berwald
Ludwig Bieberbach
Mieczysław Biernacki
Antoine Bilimovitch
Karl Bögel
Nicolas Bogoliúboff
Harald Bohr
Karol Borsuk

Heinrich Brandt
Adolphe Buhl
Giacomo Candido
Constantin Carathéodry
Torsten Carleman
Sauveur Carrus
Élie Cartan
Henri Cartan
Mary Lucy Cartwright
Giuseppe Casazza
Wilhelm Cauer
Eduard Čech
Georges Cerf
Lamberto Cesari
Ljubomir Chakaloff
Marie Charpentier
Jules Chuard

James Andrew Clarkson

Arthur William Conway
Elizabeth Buchanan Cowley

Louise Duffield Cummings

Francisco Miranda da Costa Lobo
David van Dantzig
Georges de Rham
Adolfo Del Chiaro
Paul Delens
Jean Delsarte
Basile Demtchenko
L. Des Lauriers
Max Deuring
Jacques Devisme
Odette Mongeaud-Devisme
Lloyd Lyne Dines
Pierre Dive
Gustav Doetsch
Jules Drach
Paul Drumaux
L. Gustave du Pasquier
Samuel Dumas

Alfred Errera
A. Establier
Luigi Fantappiè
Henri Fehr
Lucien Féraud
Bruno Finzi
Jonas Fjeldstad
Alfred Leon Foster
Adolf Fraenkel
Rudolf Fueter
Godofredo Garcia

André Gérardin
Giovanni Giambelli
Giovanni Giorgi
Oliver Edmunds Glenn
Lucien Godeaux
Stanislaw Golab
Karl Goldziher
Ferdinand Gonseth
Édouard Guillaume
Alf Victor Guldberg
N. Gunther
Max Gut
Jules Haag
Jacques Hadamard
Hans Ludwig Hamburger
Georg Hamel
G. H. Hardy
Helmut Hasse
Nikolaos J. Hatzidakis
Arend Heyting
Einar Hille
Nikolaus Hofreiter
Temple Rice Hollcroft
Heinz Hopf
Zdeněk Horák

Bohuslav Hostinský
Witold Hurewicz
fr:Édouard Husson

Alexandre Ivanoff
Maurice Janet

Vojtěch Jarník
Børge Jessen
Ingebrigt Johansson
Gaston Julia
Gustave Juvet
László Kalmár
Joseph Kampé de Fériet
Jovan Karamata
Edward Kasner

Ludwig Friedrich Wilhelm August Kiepert
Bronislaw Knaster
Ervand Kogbetliantz
Ernst Kolman
Arthur Korn
Gottfried Köthe
M. Kourensky

Mikhail Kravchuk
H. Krebs
Wolfgang Krull
Nikolay Mitrofanovich Krylov
Casimir Kuratowski
L. Laboccetta
J. Le Roux
Franciszek Leja
Josef Lense
Paul Lévy
Edward Hubert Linfoot
John Edensor Littlewood
M. Long
Gino Loria
Irmgard Lotz
Kurt Mahler

Szolem Mandelbrojt
A. Marchand
Karl Menger
Paul Mentré
A. Meyer-Jaccoud
Henri Milloux
L. M. Milne-Thomson
Yukio Mimura
Silvio Minetti
Richard von Mises
Edward Charles Molina
Charles Napoleon Moore
Louis J. Mordell
Marston Morse
Christian Moser
Ali Moustafa Mosharafa
Otto Mühlendyck
Wilhelm Müller
Chaim Herman Müntz
Trygve Nagell
Rolf Nevanlinna
Eric Harold Neville
Miron Nicolesco
Emmy Noether
Øystein Ore
Raymond Edward Alan Christopher Paley
C.P. Papaïoannou
Wolfgang Pauli
Joseph Pérès
Hans Petersson
Mihailo Petrovitch
Georgii Pfeiffer
Sophie Piccard
Mauro Picone
Rózsa Politzer
Hilda Pollaczek-Geiringer
Lev Pontrjagin
Kyrille Popoff
Rodolphe Nicolas Raclis
H. Rafael
George Yuri Rainich
Franz Rellich
Arnold Reymond
Dimitri Riabouchinsky
Carlo Luigi Ricci
Giovanni Ricci
Paul Riebesell
Frédéric Riesz
René Risser
Vsevolod Romanovsky

Charles Henry Rowe

Hermann Schlichting
Harry Schmidt
Jan Arnoldus Schouten

Herbert Seifert

Francesco Severi
Wacław Sierpiński
David Eugene Smith
J.J. Smith
Virgil Snyder
Andreas Speiser

Carl Størmer
Ellis Bagley Stouffer
Paolo Straneo

John Lighton Synge
Jacob David Tamarkin
Gerhard Thomsen
William Threlfall
Georges Tiercy
Leonida Tonelli

Francesco Tricomi
L. Tschakaloff
S. Tschapligin
N. Tschebotaröw
Georges Tzitzéica
Stanislaw Ulam

Georges Valiron

Paul Félix Vincensini
Tullio Viola
Enrico Volterra
Gheorghe Vrânceanu
G. N. Watson
Rolin Wavre
Ernst August Weiss
Rudolf Weyrich
J. H. C. Whitehead
Norbert Wiener
Witold Wilkosz
C.E. Winn
Julius Wolff
Dorothy Wrinch
Alexander Wundheiler
Stanisław Zaremba
Marie Zervos
Antoni Zygmund

1936, Oslo

Leifur Ásgeirsson
Lars Valerian Ahlfors
Franz Alt
Raymond Clare Archibald

Stefan Banach
Dan Barbilian
Isaac Albert Barnett
Harry Bateman
Heinrich Adolph Behnke
Harald Bergström
George David Birkhoff
Garrett Birkhoff
Vilhelm Bjerknes
Wilhelm Blaschke
Carl Böhm
Émile Borel
Karol Borsuk

Arthur Lyon Bowley

Hendrik Bremekamp
Viggo Brun
Johann Jakob Burckhardt
Bohumil Bydžovský
Élie Cartan
Mary Lucy Cartwright
Jean Cavaillès
Arthur William Conway
Arthur Herbert Copeland
Johannes van der Corput
Richard Courant
Harald Cramér
David van Dantzig
Jules Drach
Paul Drumaux

Samuel Eilenberg
Paul Erdős
Alfred Errera
Robert Arthur Fairthorne
Willy Feller
Werner Fenchel
Paul Flamant
Maurice Fréchet
Hans Freudenthal
Ragnar Frisch
Otto Frostman
Rudolf Fueter
Fujiwara Matsusaburo
Solomon Gandz
Alexander Gelfond

Joseph E. Gillis
Wallace Givens
Lucien Godeaux
Stanislaw Golab
Rolf Harald Gran Olsson
Emil Julius Gumbel
Max Gut

Gerhard Haenzel
Georg Hamel
Douglas Rayner Hartree
Helmut Hasse
Erich Hecke
Poul Heegaard
Kurt August Hirsch
Václav Hlavatý
Nikolaus Hofreiter
Zdeněk Horák
Witold Hurewicz
Maurice Janet
Vojtěch Jarník

Gottfried Köthe
Stefan Kaczmarz
Jovan Karamata

Béla Kerékjártó
Aleksandr Khinchin

Ervand Kogbetliantz
Maurice Kraitchik
Franciszek Leja
Georges Lemaître
Théophile Lepage

Louis Locher

Eugene Lukacs
Kurt Mahler
Szolem Mandelbrojt
Frédéric Marty
Karl Mayr
Stanislaw Mazur
William Hunter McCrea
Edward James McShane
Birger Meidell
Clifford William Mendel
Karl Menger
Émile Merlin

Henri Milloux
Edward Arthur Milne
Edward Charles Molina
Louis Joel Mordell
Robert Edouard Moritz
Frank Morley
Marston Morse
Theodore Motzkin
Hugh P. Mulholland
John Rogers Musselman
Trygve Nagell
Paul Nemenyi
Otto E. Neugebauer
Bernhard Hermann Neumann
M. H. A. Newman
Jakob Nielsen
Fritz Noether

Nikola Obrechkoff
Albert Cyril Offord
Rufus Oldenburger
Octav Onicescu
Øystein Ore
Wladyslaw Roman Orlicz
Carl Wilhelm Oseen
Rózsa Péter
George Pólya

C. P. Papaioannou

Fred William Perkins, Jr.
Ernst Peschl
Sophie Piccard
José María Planas Corbella
Lev Semyonovich Pontrjagin

Hans Przibram
Rodolphe Raclis
Richard Rado
Erich Reissner

Paul Reece Rider
Paul Riebesell
Marcel Riesz
Harold Stanley Ruse

Juliusz Schauder
Jan Arnoldus Schouten
Henrik Selberg
Raziuddin Siddiqui
Carl Ludwig Siegel
Waclaw Sierpinski

Thoralf Albert Skolem
Virgil Snyder
Andreas Speiser

Carl Størmer

Simion Stoilow
Marshall Harvey Stone
cs:Jindřich Svoboda
John Lighton Synge
Edward Szpilrajn

Ralph Tambs-Lyche
Olga Taussky-Todd
L. Tchakaloff
Victor Thébault
John Todd
Charles Chapman Torrance
Gheorghe Tzitzéica

Victor Vâlcovici
Manuel Sandoval Vallarta
Oswald Veblen
Kurt Vogel
Buzz M. Walker
Rolin Wavre
Tadeusz Wazewski
Alexander Weinstein
Hermann Weyl
J. H. C. Whitehead
David Vernon Widder
Norbert Wiener
Herman Wold
Laurence Chisholm Young
Kazimierz Zarankiewicz
Stanisław Zaremba

1950, Cambridge (USA)

Abraham Adrian Albert
Howard Wright Alexander
Aldo Andreotti
Richard Arens
Cahit Arf
Iacopo Barsotti
Stefan Bergman
Peter Gabriel Bergmann
Harald Bergström
Arne Beurling
R. H. Bing
Garrett Birkhoff
Salomon Bochner
Harald Bohr
Raj Chandra Bose
Alfred T. Brauer
Florent Bureau
Alberto Pedro Calderon
Henri Cartan
Mary Lucy Cartwright
Richard Eliot Chamberlin
Shiing Shen Chern
Sarvadaman Chowla
Alfred Hoblitzelle Clifford
Edward Foyle Collingwood
Charles Galton Darwin
Harold Davenport
Arnaud Denjoy
Richard James Duffin

Paul Erdős
Gaetano Fichera
Nathan Jacob Fine
Ronald Martin Foster
Ralph Fox
Kurt Gödel
Abe Gelbart
Dario Graffi
Jacques Hadamard
Fritz Herzog
Edwin Hewitt
Kurt August Hirsch
W. V. D. Hodge
Eberhard Hopf
Heinz Hopf
Sze-Tsen Hu
Witold Hurewicz
Kenkichi Iwasawa
Shizuo Kakutani
Stephen Cole Kleene
Hendrik Douwe Kloosterman
Paul Lévy
Hans Lewy
Kurt Mahler
Szolem Mandelbrojt
Marston Morse
George Polya
Hans Rademacher
Franz Rellich
Joseph Fels Ritt
Abraham Robinson
Adolphe Rome
Samarendra Nath Roy
Luis Antonio Santalo
Laurent Schwartz
Beniamino Segre
Atle Selberg
Thoralf Skolem
Alfred Tarski
John von Neumann
Abraham Wald
André Weil
Hassler Whitney
Norbert Wiener
Raymond Louis Wilder
Oscar Zariski

1954, Amsterdam

At the 1954 Congress of Mathematicians in Amsterdam, Richard Brauer announced his program for the classification of finite simple groups.

P. S. Alexandrov
J. Barkley Rosser
Heinrich Adolph Louis Behnke
David Blackwell
Karol Borsuk
Richard Brauer
Florent Bureau
Mary Lucy Cartwright
Lamberto Cesari
K. S. Chandrasekharan
Lothar Collatz
H. S. M. Coxeter
Harold Davenport
Jean Dieudonné
Joseph L. Doob
Beno Eckmann
Paul Erdős
Arthur Erdélyi
Gaetano Fichera
Robert Fortet
Hans Freudenthal
Israel Gelfand
Sydney Goldstein
Harish Chandra
Walter Kurt Hayman
Magnus Rudolph Hestenes
Einar Hille
Edmund Hlawka
Nathan Jacobson
Børge Jessen
Joseph Kampé de Fériet
Kunihiko Kodaira
A. N. Kolmogorov
Đuro Kurepa
André Lichnerowicz
Paul Lorenzen
Deane Montgomery
Andrzej Mostowski
Pekka Juhana Myrberg
André Néron
Jerzy Neyman
S. M. Nikolskii
Douglas Geoffrey Northcott

Franz Rellich
Beniamino Segre
Jean-Pierre Serre
Eduard Stiefel
James Johnston Stoker
Alfred Tarski
Edward Charles Titchmarsh
David van Dantzig
John von Neumann
Tadeusz Wazewski
André Weil
Alexander Weinstein
Kentaro Yano
Kosaku Yosida
Antoni Zygmund

1958, Edinburgh
Alexander Grothendieck (pictured) in his plenary lecture at the 1958 Congress outlined his programme "to create arithmetic geometry via a (new) reformulation of algebraic geometry, seeking maximal generality."

A. D. Alexandrov
V. I. Arnold
Lipman Bers
Evert Willem Beth
N. N. Bogolyubov
Raoul Bott
Henri Cartan
S. S. Chern
Claude Chevalley
Kai Lai Chung
Max Deuring
Samuel Eilenberg
William Feller
Lars Gårding
B. V. Gnedenko
Hans Grauert
Alexander Grothendieck
Maurice Heins
Graham Higman
Friedrich Hirzebruch
Joseph Ehrenfried Hofmann
Stephen Cole Kleene
Antoni Kosinski
Georg Kreisel
Đuro Kurepa
Cornelius Lanczos
Derrick Henry Lehmer
Yuri Linnik
Jacques-Louis Lions
Andrey Markov Jr.
Teruhisa Matsusaka
Dmitrii Menshov
John Willard Milnor
Subbaramiah Minakshisundaram
John Coleman Moore
Masayoshi Nagata
Albert Nijenhuis
C. D. Papakyriakopoulos
L. S. Pontryagin
Alfréd Rényi
Peter Roquette
Klaus Friedrich Roth
Heinz Rutishauser
Pierre Samuel
Leonard Jimmie Savage
Menahem Max Schiffer
Beniamino Segre
Goro Shimura
Norman Earl Steenrod
Béla Szőkefalvi-Nagy
George Frederick James Temple
René Thom
G. E. Uhlenbeck
Adriaan van Wijngaarden
V. S. Vladimirov
Hsien Chung Wang
Helmut Wielandt

1962, Stockholm
At the 1962 Congress in Stockholm Kiyosi Itô (pictured) lectured on how to combine differential geometry and stochastic analysis, and this led to major advances in the 60s and 70s.

John Frank Adams
Shmuel Agmon
Aldo Andreotti
Michael Francis Atiyah
Maurice Auslander
Walter Lewis Baily, Jr.
Marcel Berger
R. H. Bing
Armand Borel
Lennart Carleson
J. W. S. Cassels
Gustave Choquet
Alonzo Church
Paul Joseph Cohen
Albrecht Dold
Bernard Dwork
E. B. Dynkin
Beno Eckmann
Leon Ehrenpreis
Edwin E. Floyd
Tudor Ganea
I. M. Gelfand
Harold Grad
Hans Grauert
Peter K. Henrici
Heisuke Hironaka
Lars Hörmander
Gilbert Agnew Hunt
Jun Igusa
Kiyosi Itô
James Allister Jenkins
Jean-Pierre Kahane
Miroslav Katetov
Michel Kervaire
Martin Kneser
A. N. Kolmogorov
A. I. Kostrikin
Masatake Kuranishi
Jean Leray
Yuri Linnik
Jerzy Łoś
Paul Malliavin
John Milnor
Jürgen Moser
David Mumford
Leopoldo Nachbin
Raghavan Narasimhan
M. H. A. Newman
Louis Nirenberg
P. S. Novikov
I. I. Pjateckii-Sapiro
Andrzej Pliś
Valentin Poénaru
I. R. Shafarevich
Dana Scott
Atle Selberg
Jean-Pierre Serre
G. E. Silov
Yakov Sinai
Stephen Smale
Yuri Mikhailovich Smirnov
John Robert Stallings, Jr.
Guido Stampacchia
Elias M. Stein
Michio Suzuki
Béla Szőkefalvi-Nagy
John Tate
John Griggs Thompson
Jacques Tits
John Wermer
G. W. Whitehead
Arthur Strong Wightman

1966, Moscow

There were thirty-one Invited Addresses (eight in Abstract) at the 1966 congress.

Shreeram Shankar Abhyankar
John Frank Adams

D. V. Anosov
V. I. Arnold
Michael Artin
Michael Francis Atiyah
Hyman Bass
Richard Bellman
Bryan John Birch
Errett Albert Bishop
A. A. Borovkov
William Browder
Alberto Pedro Calderon
Lennart Carleson
Jean Cerf
Paul Joseph Cohen
Ennio De Giorgi
Jacques Dixmier
Adrien Douady
N. V. Efimov
Peter Elias
Ju. L. Ersov
Paul R. Garabedian
Frederick William Gehring
V. M. Glushkov
E. S. Golod
A. A. Goncar
Mark Iosifovich Graev
Hans Grauert
Ulf Grenander
André Haefliger
Jack K. Hale
Harish-Chandra
Morris William Hirsch
I. A. Ibragimov
Fritz John
Adolf P. Juskevic
Wilhelm Klingenberg
Joseph John Kohn
Ellis Robert Kolchin
M. G. Krein
Olga Ladyzhenskaya
Peter David Lax
Olli Lehto
Bernard Malgrange
A. I. Malzev
Yuri I. Manin
G. I. Marchuk
Louis Michel
B. S. Mitjagin
N. N. Moiseev
André Néron
Sergei P. Novikov
T. Ono
V. P. Palamodov

Aleksander Pełczyński
Ilya Piatetski-Shapiro
V. I. Ponomarev
Aleksei Georgievich Postnikov
Reinhold Remmert
Hugo E. Rossi
J. Schröder
Kurt Schütte
Irving Ezra Segal
Goro Shimura

Stephen Smale
Sergei L. Sobolev
Charles M. Stein
Robert Steinberg
Volker Strassen
John Trevor Stuart
John Griggs Thompson
A. N. Tikhonov
V. A. Toponogov
Gregory S. Tseytin
Kazimierz Urbanik
Robert Lawson Vaught
Edoardo Vesentini
I. M. Vinogradov
M. I. Vishik
A. G. Vitushkin
C. T. C. Wall
James Hardy Wilkinson
Erik Christopher Zeeman

1970, Nice

S. I. Adjan
Shmuel Agmon
Vladimir Mikhailovich Alekseev
Frederick J. Almgren, Jr.
S. A. Amitsur
Donald Werner Anderson
Richard Davis Anderson
Michel André
Aldo Andreotti
Anatoli N. Andrianov
N. U. Arakelyan
Huzihiro Araki
Alexander Arhangelskii
Michael Artin
Michael Francis Atiyah
James Ax
Alan Baker
Michael Barr
Oleg V. Besov

Jean-Michel Bony
Raoul Bott
Louis Boutet de Monvel
Richard Brauer
Egbert Brieskorn
Felix E. Browder
William Browder
François Bruhat
Donald L. Burkholder
Pierre Cartier
J. W. S. Cassels
A. V. Černavskii
Rafael Van Severen Chacon
Shiing-Shen Chern
Nikolai Chudakov
Kai Lai Chung
Paul Moritz Cohn
Charles Cameron Conley
John Horton Conway

Pierre Deligne
Aryeh Dvoretzky
Eugene Dynkin
David Gregory Ebin
David Albert Edwards
James Eells
J. V. Egorov
Kenneth David Elworthy
Ju. L. Ersov
F. Thomas Farrell
Solomon Feferman
Walter Feit
J. M. G. Fell
Ciprian Foias
Frank Forelli
Otto Forster
Bent Fuglede
Harry Furstenberg
Lars Gårding
Israel Gelfand
Ronald Kay Getoor
Jean Giraud
George Glauberman
Daniel Gorenstein
Phillip Griffiths

Detlef Gromoll
M. L. Gromov
Alexander Grothendieck
Victor Vasilievich Grushin
Victor Guillemin
Robert Clifford Gunning
Günter Harder
Walter Kurt Hayman
Zdeněk Hedrlín
Sigurdur Helgason
Henry Helson
Donald Gordon Higman
Peter Hilton
Heisuke Hironaka
Lars Hörmander
Wu-Chung Hsiang
Richard Allen Hunt
Yasutaka Ihara
Kenkichi Iwasawa
Zvonimir Janko
Richard V. Kadison
Max Karoubi
Tosio Kato
Nicholas Michael Katz
Howard Jerome Keisler
Harry Kesten
Reinhardt Kiehl
Robion Cromwell Kirby
Steven Lawrence Kleiman
Shoshichi Kobayashi
Max Koecher
Bertram Kostant
A. I. Kostrikin
Tomio Kubota
Nicolaas Hendrik Kuiper
Masatake Kuranishi
Shige Toshi Kuroda
Robert Phelan Langlands
Richard Lashof
Francis William Lawvere
Peter David Lax
Jerome Paul Levine
B. M. Levitan
Joram Lindenstrauss
Jacques-Louis Lions
Stanislaw Lojasiewicz
Santiago Lopez de Medrano
Ian G. Macdonald
George Whitelaw Mackey
Yuri I. Manin
G. I. Marchuk
Jerrold Eldon Marsden
André Martineau
Yu. V. Matijasevic
Yves Meyer

Mario Miranda
A. S. Mishchenko
B. G. Moishezon
Gabriel Mokobodzki
Paul Monsky
John Coleman Moore
Charles B. Morrey, Jr.
George Daniel Mostow
David Mumford
Béla Szőkefalvi-Nagy
M. A. Naimark
M. S. Narasimhan
Bernhard Hermann Neumann
Sergei P. Novikov
Olga Oleinik
Donald S. Ornstein
Richard Sheldon Palais
A. N. Paršin
Bill Parry
Jaak Peetre
Franklin Paul Peterson
Albrecht Pfister
Frédéric Pham
Ralph Saul Phillips
A. V. Pogorelov
Lev Pontryagin
Charles C. Pugh
Lajos Pukánszky
Daniel Quillen
Michael Oser Rabin
M. S. Raghunathan
Michel Raynaud
Daniel Rider
Abraham Robinson
Helmut Röhrl
Colin P. Rourke
Walter Rudin
Gerald Enoch Sacks
Mikio Sato
V. V. Sazonov
Andrzej Schinzel
Wolfgang M. Schmidt
Robert Thomas Seeley
G. B. Segal
I. E. Segal
James Serrin
C. S. Seshadri
Igor Shafarevich
Goro Shimura
A. N. Shiryayev
Laurent Siebenmann
Yakov Sinai
Maurice Sion
Donald Clayton Spencer
V. G. Sprindzuk
John R. Stallings
Guido Stampacchia
Harold Mead Stark
Elias M. Stein
Anatoly Mikhailovich Stepin
Dennis Sullivan
Michio Suzuki
Richard G. Swan
Masamichi Takesaki
John Tate
René Thom
John Griggs Thompson
Jacques Tits
Jean-Claude Tougeron
François Trèves
Paul Turán
P. L. Uljanov
Nina Uraltseva
Nicholas Varopoulos
Petr Vopěnka
C. T. C. Wall
Robert Fones Williams
Zvonimir Janko

1974, Vancouver

Norbert A'Campo
William K. Allard
R. V. Ambartzumian
D. V. Anosov
S. J. Arakelov
V. I. Arnold
Claudio Baiocchi
M. Salah Baouendi
Wolf Barth
Kenneth Jon Barwise
Ja. M. Barzdin
Hyman Bass
Heinz Bauer
Alain Bensoussan
George Mark Bergman

Enrico Bombieri
Armand Borel
Rufus Bowen
James Henry Bramble
Haim Brezis
Victor Buchstaber
Thomas Ashland Chapman
Jeff Cheeger
E. W. Cheney
Zbigniew Ciesielski
Charles Herbert Clemens
Alfred Hoblitzelle Clifford
Jean-Michel Combes
Alain Connes
Michael Grain Crandall
Gerard Debreu
Pierre Deligne
Vladimir F. Demyanov
Roland Dobrushin
Richard Mansfield Dudley
G. F. D. Duff
Michel Duflo
J. J. Duistermaat
E. B. Dynkin
M. M. Dzrbasjan
David Eisenbud
Per Enflo
Jacques Faraut
Charles Fefferman
V. V. Filippov
William J. Firey
A. T. Fomenko
Albrecht Fröhlich
Eberhard Freitag
Avner Friedman
Harvey Friedman
Howard Garland
Frederick William Gehring
Stephen M. Gersten
James Glimm
B. V. Gnedenko
András Hajnal
Thomas Hawkins
Henry Hermes
Horst Herrlich
Alan J. Hoffman
Christopher Hooley
Roger Evans Howe

Peter J. Huber
Masahisa Inoue
Bjarni Jónsson
Hervé Jacquet
A. A. Karacuba
David Kazhdan
David Kinderlehrer
Victor Klee
Daniel J. Kleitman
Anthony W. Knapp

Heinz-Otto Kreiss
Wolfgang Krieger
Harold J. Kushner
Oscar Lanford
H. Blaine Lawson
Jacqueline Lelong-Ferrand
A. F. Leontiev
Elliott H. Lieb
Rolf Lindner
Jacques-Louis Lions
George Lusztig
G. A. Margulis
Lawrence Markus
André Martin
Bernard Maskit
John N. Mather
Geoffrey Matthews
Bernard Maurey
Barry Mazur
V. D. Mazurov
Kevin McCrimmon
Peter McMullen
Albert R. Meyer
R. James Milgram
Eric Charles Milner
Hugh Lowell Montgomery
P. A. P. Moran
Yiannis N. Moschovakis
N. N. Nehorosev
Edward Nelson
Jacques Neveu
Louis Nirenberg
Michael Stewart Paterson
V. K. Patodi
Mauricio Matos Peixoto
Ted Petrie
Vladimir Petrovich Platonov
Daniel Quillen
Richard Rado
C. R. Rao
John Robert Ringrose
Claude Ambrose Rogers
H. L. Royden
Mary Ellen Rudin

A. A. Samarski
Winfried Scharlau
Wolfgang M. Schmidt
Paul A. Schweitzer
Saharon Shelah
Jack Silver
Barry Simon
Isadore Manuel Singer
Andrei A. Slavnov
Frank Spitzer
Erling Størmer

S. A. Stepanov
Hans J. Stetter
Gilbert Strang
Volker Strassen
Kurt Strebel

Dennis Sullivan
Aleksei Georgievich Sveshnikov
Moss Eisenberg Sweedler
Endre Szemerédi
Joseph L. Taylor
William Thurston
Jacques Tits
Clifford Truesdell
John Wilder Tukey
V. S. Varadarajan
A. N. Varchenko
Anatoly Vershik
M. I. Vishik
A. G. Vitushkin
Valentin Evgenyevich Voskresenskii
Bertram Walsh
John Walsh
Benjamin Weiss
James Hardy Wilkinson
Philip Wolfe
C. E. Mike Yates
Vladimir E. Zakharov
Erik Christopher Zeeman

1978, Helsinki

Lars Valerian Ahlfors
Frederick J. Almgren, Jr.
Huzihiro Araki
Michael Aschbacher
Michael Francis Atiyah
Robert J. Aumann
Albert Baernstein II
Thomas Francis Banchoff
William Beckner
I. N. Bernshtein
Spencer Bloch
F. A. Bogomolov
O. I. Bogoyavlensky
Jerry Bona
A. A. Borovkov
Sergei Viktorovich Bochkarev
Kenneth Stephen Brown
A. D. Bruno
Pavol Brunovsky
Alberto Pedro Calderon
James Weldon Cannon
Sylvain Edward Cappell
William Casselman
A. J. Casson
G. V. Chudnovsky
Francis H. Clarke
John H. Coates
Robert Connelly
Alain Connes
John Horton Conway
Carl R. de Boor
Claude Dellacherie
Jacques Dixmier
Manfredo P. do Carmo
Roland Dobrushin
Ronald George Douglas
V. G. Drinfeld

Ivar Ekeland
L. D. Faddeev
Bernd Fischer
Ciprian Foias
Jürg Fröhlich
Dmitry Fuks
Masatoshi Fukushima
Adriano Mario Garsia
David Gieseker
Daniel Gorenstein
Phillip A. Griffiths
M. L. Gromov
Wolfgang Haken
Leo Harrington
Allen Edward Hatcher
Michael Robert Herman
Melvin Hochster
Ju. S. Ilyashenko
Victor Ivrii
Henryk Iwaniec
S. V. Jablonskii
Arthur Jaffe
V. G. Kac
Masaki Kashiwara
Nicholas Michael Katz
George Kempf
V. M. Kharlamov
A. A. Kirillov
Boris Korenblum
Nikolai N. Krasovskii
Nicolai V. Krylov
R. P. Langlands
David G. Larman
James Lepowsky
James P. Lin
Eduard Looijenga
Angus J. Macintyre
Ib Madsen
G. S. Makanin
John Mallet-Paret
Yuri I. Manin
Sibe Mardesic
A. I. Markushevich
Donald A. Martin
Richard McGehee
Henry P. McKean
Richard Burt Melrose
Jürgen Moser
E. M. Nikishin
N. K. Nikolskii
Joachim A. Nitsche
Sergei P. Novikov
Robert Osserman
Jacob Palis
Roger Penrose
Ilya Piatetski-Shapiro
V. P. Platonov
Claudio Procesi
Paul H. Rabinowitz
S. Ramanan
Douglas Conner Ravenel
Pierre-Arnaud Raviart
Pal Revesz
Andrei Vladimirovich Roiter 
Gian-Carlo Rota
Grzegorz Rozenberg
Shoichiro Sakai
A. A. Samarski
Wilfried Schmid
Goro Shimura

A. N. Shiryayev
Charles Coffin Sims
Yakov Sinai
Yum-Tong Siu
Johannes Sjöstrand
Henri Skoda
Robert Irving Soare
Andrei Suslin
H. J. Sussmann
Vidar Thomee
William Paul Thurston
Robert Tijdeman
Kenji Ueno
Dietmar Uhlig
Jussi Väisälä
Wilberd van der Kallen
S. R. S. Varadhan
Robert Charles Vaughan
Nolan Russell Wallach
André Weil
Alan Weinstein
Alexander D. Wentzell
J. E. West
Gavin C. Wraith
Shing-Tung Yau
Gregg Jay Zuckerman

1983, Warsaw

Michael Aizenman
Antonio Ambrosetti
Anatoli N. Andrianov
V. I. Arnold
James Arthur
Richard Askey
John MacLeod Ball
Wolf Barth
Alexander Beilinson
Jean-Michel Bony
Jean Bourgain
David R. Brillinger
Roger Ware Brockett
V. S. Buslaev
Luis Caffarelli
Shiu-Yuen Cheng
Gregory L. Cherlin
D. M. Chibisov
Frederick Ronald Cohen
Ralph Louis Cohen
B. E. J. Dahlberg
Ennio De Giorgi
Simon Kirwan Donaldson
Bjorn Engquist
Paul Erdős
Gregory Eskin
Tadeusz Figiel
Wendell Helms Fleming
Dominique Foata
Jean-Marc Fontaine
John Erik Fornaess
Michael Hartley Freedman
Hans Freudenthal
William Fulton
Jean-Yves Girard
Roland Glowinski
Gene Howard Golub
R. L. Graham
Robert Griess
M. L. Gromov
Joe Harris
F. Reese Harvey
D. R. Heath-Brown
Gennadi M. Henkin
Nigel James Hitchin
Christopher Hooley
Wu-Chung Hsiang
Shigeru Iitaka
Vasilii Alekseevich Iskovskikh
R. S. Ismagilov
Tadeusz Iwaniec
Jens Carsten Jantzen
Peter Wilcox Jones
Anthony Joseph
Feng Kang
Richard Karp
B. S. Kašin
G. G. Kasparov
Anatole Katok
Steven Paul Kerckhoff
Harry Kesten
L. G. Khachiyan
A. G. Khovanskii
Sergiu Klainerman
Hans-Wilhelm Knobloch
Nancy Kopell
A. B. Kurzanskii
Yuri A. Kuznetsov
Olga Ladyzhenskaya

Peter David Lax

Wen-Hsiung Lin
Pierre-Louis Lions
Peter Albert Loeb
László Lovász
George Lusztig
Robert Duncan MacPherson
Andrew Majda
Paul Malliavin
Benoit B. Mandelbrot
Petr Mandl
Ricardo Mane
V. P. Maslov
David William Masser
Barry Mazur
Yves Meyer
Charles Anthony Micchelli
Michal Misiurewicz
Shigefumi Mori
Werner Müller
Arthur Ogus
Alexander Yu. Olshanskii
Toshio Oshima
Konrad Osterwalder
Rajagopalan Parthasarathy

Aleksander Pełczyński
Sergey Pinchuk
Gilles Pisier
Gordon Plotkin
A. V. Pogorelov
M. J. D. Powell
Michael O. Rabin
Kenneth Alan Ribet
Claus Michael Ringel
R. T. Rockafellar
David Ruelle
Mikio Sato
Wolfgang M. Schmidt
Richard M. Schoen
George Roger Sell
James Serrin
Julius L. Shaneson
Saharon Shelah
Richard Arnold Shore
Leon Simon
Yum-Tong Siu
A. O. Slisenko
Christophe Soulé
Richard P. Stanley
Daniel W. Stroock

Leon Takhtajan
Robert Tarjan
Bernard Teissier
René Thom
Karen Uhlenbeck
Leslie Gabriel Valiant
J. H. van Lint
Pierre van Moerbeke
A. B. Venkov
Michèle Vergne
E. B. Vinberg
Oleg Yanovich Viro
Dan-Virgil Voiculescu
Jean-Loup Waldspurger
Shinzo Watanabe
S. L. Woronowicz

Vladimir E. Zakharov
Efim Zelmanov
B. I. Zilber

1986, Berkeley

A. B. Aleksandrov
Hans Wilhelm Alt
Taivo Arak
Enrico Arbarello
Maurice Auslander
Tadeusz Balaban
Hans Werner Ballmann
Isabella Bashmakova
Arnaud Beauville
József Beck
G. V. Belyi
Jean-Michel Bismut
Anders Björner
Manuel Blum
Walter Borho
Mikhail V. Borovoi
H. J. M. Bos
Jean Bourgain
Franco Brezzi
Michel Broué
Robert Bryant
Gunnar Carlsson
A. J. Casson
David Catlin
Sun-Yung Alice Chang
Jeff Cheeger
Alexandre Joel Chorin
Herbert Clemens
Laurent Clozel
Yves Colin de Verdière
Jean-Louis Colliot-Thelene
Alain Connes
Germund Dahlquist
Guy David
Alexander Munro Davie
M. H. A. Davis
Louis de Branges
Corrado De Concini
Ronald J. DiPerna
Simon Kirwan Donaldson
Adrien Douady
V. G. Drinfeld
Jean-Pierre Eckmann
Edward George Effros
G. P. Egorychev
Yakov Eliashberg
Lawrence Craig Evans
Gerd Faltings
Jürg Fröhlich
Péter Frankl
Igor Frenkel
Pierre Gabriel
Giovanni Gallavotti
John B. Garnett
Krzysztof Gawedzki
Frederick William Gehring
Stuart Geman
Mariano Giaquinta
Vitaly Ginzburg
Efim D. Gluskin
S. K. Godunov
Dorian Goldfeld
A. A. Gonchar
J. V. Grabiner
Christine Graffigne
D. Yu. Grigor'ev
M. L. Gromov
Benedict Hyman Gross
Uffe Haagerup
Richard S. Hamilton
R. M. Hardt
Thomas W. Hawkins, Jr.
Dennis Arnold Hejhal
Haruzo Hida
Werner Hildenbrand
Alexander Holevo
Victor Ivrii
Henryk Iwaniec
M. V. Jakobson
V. F. R. Jones
Jürgen Jost
Jean-Pierre Kahane
Narendra Karmarkar
David Kazhdan
Alexander S. Kechris
Carlos Eduardo Kenig
H. V. Koch
V. V. Kozlov
R. E. Krichevsky
N. G. Kruzhilin

Nicolai V. Krylov
Hiroshi Kunita
Ivan A. K. Kupka
Philip Caesar Kutzko
Alistair H. Lachlan
Oscar Lanford
László Lempert
Hendrik Willem Lenstra
Thomas Milton Liggett
Menachem Magidor
Nikolai G. Makarov
Yuri I. Manin
John N. Mather
William Hamilton Meeks, III
Alexander Merkurjev
Jean-François Mertens
Haynes Miller
Vitali Milman
Tetsuji Miwa
John Willard Morgan
V. V. Nikulin
Andrew Michael Odlyzko
Alexander M. Olevskii
Steven Alan Orszag
George C. Papanicolaou
L. A. Pastur
Mikhail G. Peretyatkin
Yakov Pesin
Nicholas Pippenger
Vladimir L. Popov
Frank Quinn
A. A. Razborov
John Rinzel
Ernst Alfred Ruh
Arnold Schönhage

Richard Melvin Schoen
Alexander Schrijver
Jacob T. Schwartz

Caroline Series
Paul D. Seymour
Peter B. Shalen
Adi Shamir
Micha Sharir
Saharon Shelah
V. V. Shokurov
A. V. Skorokhod
Stephen Smale

Thomas Spencer
Elias M. Stein
Charles Joel Stone
Dennis Sullivan
A. A. Suslin
Floris Takens
Clifford Taubes
Tammo Tom Dieck
Anthony Joseph Tromba
Nina Uraltseva
Eckart Viehweg
David Alexander Vogan
Gisbert Wüstholz
Henry Christian Wente
Alex Wilkie
R. L. Wilson
Edward Witten
Thomas Hartwig Wolff
Scott Andrew Wolpert
W. Hugh Woodin
Wu Wen-Tsun
Victor Yakhot
Don Zagier
Eduard Zehnder
Robert Jeffrey Zimmer

1990, Kyoto

Noga Alon
Marcel Bökstedt
László Babai
Dan Barbasch
Martin T. Barlow
Rodney James Baxter
Eric Douglas Bedford
Spencer Bloch
Lenore Blum
Francis Bonahon
César Camacho
Peter J. Cameron
Lennart Carleson
Jon F. Carlson
Alexandre L. Chistov
Michael Christ
Demetrios Christodoulou
Ronald Raphael Coifman
Stephen Arthur Cook
Jean-Michel Coron
Joachim Cuntz
Persi Diaconis
Roland L. Dobrushin
Sergio Doplicher
Richard Timothy Durrett
Jean Écalle
Boris L. Feigin
Joel Feldman
Andreas Floer
Kenji Fukaya
Hillel Furstenberg
Matthias Günther
David Gabai
Étienne Ghys
Henri Gillet
Shafi Goldwasser
Thomas G. Goodwillie
Cameron Gordon
Rostislav Grigorchuk
Karsten Grove
Günter Harder
Ami Harten
Helmut Hofer
Philip Holmes
Annick Horiuchi
Ehud Hrushovski
Craig Huneke
Martin Huxley
Kiyoshi Igusa
Yasutaka Ihara
Mitsuru Ikawa
Ju. S. Ilyashenko
Alexander A. Ivanov
Michio Jimbo
Lowell E. Jones
Vaughan F. R. Jones
William Morton Kahan
Alexander V. Karzanov
Masaki Kashiwara
Kazuya Kato
Yujiro Kawamata
Alexander R. Kemer
János Kollár
Victor Kolyvagin
Shinichi Kotani
Robert Krasny
Igor Krichever
Peter B. Kronheimer
Antti Kupiainen
Shigeo Kusuoka
Jesper Lützen
Gérard Laumon
Robert Kendall Lazarsfeld
Lucien Marie Le Cam
Gilles Lebeau
Fang-Hua Lin
Pierre-Louis Lions
László Lovász
Sylvia Chin-Pi Lu
George Lusztig
Colette Moeglin
Andrew Joseph Majda
Yuri I. Manin
Grigory Margulis
Olivier Mathieu
Toshihiko Matsuki
Dusa McDuff
Curt McMullen
Richard Burt Melrose
Yves F. Meyer
John J. Millson
Masayasu Mimura
Stanislav A. Molchanov
Masatake Mori
Shigefumi Mori
Shigeyuki Morita
Henri Moscovici
Takafumi Murai
Haruo Murakami
Anatoly I. Neishtadt
Yuri Valentinovich Nesterenko
Sheldon E. Newhouse
Adrian Ocneanu
Takeo Ohsawa
Michael V. Pimsner
Sorin Popa
Gopal Prasad
David Preiss
Vojtěch Rödl
Stephen Rallis
Mary Rees
James Renegar
Nicolai Reshetikhin
Paul Calvin Roberts
Klaus Wilhelm Roggenkamp
Kyoji Saito
Morihiko Saito
Leslie Saper
Peter Clive Sarnak
Pierre Schapira
Albert Schwarz
Graeme Segal
Tetsuji Shioda
Eugenii I. Shustin
Nessim Sibony
Israel Michael Sigal
Carlos Tschudi Simpson
Yakov Sinai
Georges Skandalis
Theodore Allen Slaman
John R. Steel
Joseph H. M. Steenbrink
Michael Struwe
Toshikazu Sunada
Kanehisa Takasaki
Michel Talagrand
Éva Tardos
Luc Tartar
Michael E. Taylor
Robert W. Thomason
Carsten Thomassen
Gang Tian
Akihiro Tsuchiya
Vladimir Turaev
Karen Uhlenbeck
Lou van den Dries
Alexandre Varchenko
Nicholas Theodore Varopoulos
Paul Vojta
Alexander Volberg
Avi Wigderson
S. L. Woronowicz
Jean-Christophe Yoccoz
Marc Yor
Efim Zelmanov

1994, Zürich

Jeffrey Adams
Andrei A. Agrachev
Henning Haahr Andersen
Michael T. Anderson
Marco Avellaneda
László Babai
Victor Bangert
Richard F. Bass
James E. Baumgartner
J. Thomas Beale
Jean Bellissard
A. A. Bolibruch
Sergey V. Bolotin
Richard Ewen Borcherds
Jean Bourgain

Marc Burger
Colin J. Bushnell
Kung Ching Chang
Jean-Yves Chemin
Fan R. K. Chung
Philippe G. Ciarlet
Phillip Colella
Peter Constantin
John Horton Conway
Kevin Corlette
Constantine Michael Dafermos
Wolfgang Dahmen
S. G. Dani
Ingrid Daubechies
Donald Andrew Dawson
Jean-Pierre Demailly
David L. Donoho
David Drasin
Noam Elkies
George A. Elliott
Gerd Faltings
Giovanni Felder
Hans Föllmer
Jürg Fröhlich
John Franks
Edward Frenkel
John B. Friedlander
Zoltán Füredi
Jürgen Gärtner
Alexander Givental
Oded Goldreich
Gene H. Golub
Robert Ernest Gompf
Alexander Goncharov
William Timothy Gowers
Andrew Granville
Manoussos G. Grillakis
David Harbater
Jan P. Hogendijk
Michael Jerome Hopkins
Deborah Hughes Hallett
Uwe Jannsen
David Jerison
Mark Jerrum
Jeffry Kahn
Gil Kalai
Nikolaos Kapouleas
Joseph B. Keller

Eberhard Kirchberg
Frances Kirwan
Maxim Kontsevich
Olga Ladyzhenskaya
Jean Lannes
H. Blaine Lawson
Claude LeBrun
François Ledrappier
Tom Leighton
Leonid Levin
Jian-Shu Li
Jun Li
Elliott H. Lieb
Pierre-Louis Lions
Peter Littelmann
Roberto Longo
Alain Louveau
Alexander Lubotzky
John Edwin Luecke
Mikhail Lyubich
Zhi-Ming Ma
Ricardo Mane
Howard Masur
Hiroshi Matano
David W. McLaughlin
Joyce R. McLaughlin
Jean-François Mestre
Yoichi Miyaoka
Ngaiming Mok
Greg Moore (physicist)
David R. Morrison
Tomasz Mrowka
Charles M. Newman
Noam Nisan
Madhav Vithal Nori
Edward Wilfred Odell, Jr.
Stanley Osher
George Oster
Étienne Pardoux
Raman Parimala
Karen Hunger Parshall
K. R. Parthasarathy (probabilist)
Grigori Perelman
Edwin Arend Perkins
Bernadette Perrin-Riou
Benoit Perthame
Duong Hong Phong
Anand Pillay
Carl Pomerance
Pavel Pudlak
Jean-Pierre Quadrat
Michael Rapoport
Marina Ratner
Eliyahu Rips
Raoul Robert
Vladimir Rokhlin, Jr.
Joachim H. Rubinstein
Alexei N. Rudakov
Dietmar Arno Salamon
Jesús María Sanz-Serna
Joel Schneider
Erhard Scholz
Gerald W. Schwarz
Stephen W. Semmes
Paul Seymour
Julius L. Shaneson
Jalal Shatah
Mitsuhiro Shishikura
Gordon Douglas Slade
Wolfgang Soergel
Christopher Donald Sogge
Eduardo D. Sontag
Panagiotis E. Souganidis
Joel Spencer
Joel Spruck
John Stillwell

Andrei Suslin
Vladimir Sverak
Hiroshi Tanaka
Clifford Taubes
Richard Taylor
Eugene Trubowitz
Pekka Tukia
Michel Van den Bergh
S. R. S. Varadhan
Victor A. Vassiliev
Anatoly M. Vershik
Marcelo Viana

Dan-Virgil Voiculescu
Claire Voisin
Jean-Loup Waldspurger
Antony Wassermann
Sidney M. Webster
Shmuel Weinberger
Andrew Wiles
Mariusz Wodzicki
Jean-Christophe Yoccoz
Lai-Sang Young

1998, Berlin

Miklós Ajtai
David Aldous
George E. Andrews
James Arthur
Michèle Artigue
Paul S. Aspinwall
Kari Astala
Marco Avellaneda
Victor V. Batyrev
Bonnie Berger
Vladimir G. Berkovich
Joseph Bernstein
Fabrice Bethuel
Gregory Beylkin
Jean-Michel Bismut

Béla Bollobás
Maury Bramson
Detlev Buchholz
Dmitri Burago
Maria G. Bartolini Bussi
Jennifer Tour Chayes
Karine Chemla
Ivan Cherednik
F. Michael Christ
Tobias Colding
Pierre Collet
Pierre Colmez
William Cook
Maurizio Cornalba
Joseph Dauben

Aise Johan de Jong
Welington de Melo
Percy Deift
Christopher Deninger
Persi Diaconis
Robbert Dijkgraaf
Simon Donaldson
A.N. Dranishnikov
Andreas Dress
Boris Dubrovin
William Duke
William G. Dwyer
Yakov Eliashberg
L. Håkan Eliasson
Björn Engquist
Alex Eskin
Joan Feigenbaum
Ronald Fintushel
Matthew Foreman
András Frank
Michael Freedman
Mark Freidlin
Eric Friedlander
Giovanni Gallavotti
Sylvestre Gallot
Jayanta Ghosh
Antonio Giorgilli
Michel Goemans
Friedrich Götze
Yury Grabovsky
Gian Michele Graf
François Gramain
Jeremy Gray
Mark Green
Leslie Greengard
Ulf Grenander
Wolfgang Hackbusch
Peter Hall
Johan Håstad
Shuhei Hayashi
Frédéric Hélein
Michael Herman
Nigel Higson
Greg Hjorth
Bernard R. Hodgson
Helmut Hofer
Frank Hoppensteadt
Thomas Hou
Ehud Hrushovski
Gerhard Huisken
Gérard Iooss
Sergei V. Ivanov
Robert R. Jensen
Iain M. Johnstone
Dominic Joyce
William Kantor
Mikhail Kapranov
Yuri Kifer
Robert Kottwitz
Sergei B. Kuksin
Krystyna Kuperberg
François Labourie
Michael Lacey
Laurent Lafforgue
Alain Lascoux
Jean-François Le Gall
Donald John Lewis
Hans Lindblad
Joachim Lohkamp
Ian G. Macdonald
Matei Machedon
Mark Mahowald
Stéphane Mallat
Gunter Malle
Jiří Matoušek
Pertti Mattila
Barry M. McCoy
Dusa McDuff
Curtis T. McMullen
Loïc Merel
Frank Merle
Vitali Milman
Graeme Milton
Tetsuji Miwa
Shinichi Mochizuki
Cathleen Synge Morawetz
Jürgen Moser
Shahar Mozes
Detlef Müller
Stefan Müller
Ludomir Newelski
Harald Niederreiter
Mogens Niss
Jorge Nocedal
Tomotada Ohtsuki
Hisashi Okamoto
Bob Oliver
George Papanicolaou
Charles S. Peskin
Sergey Pinchuk
Ulrich Pinkall
Gilles Pisier
Toniann Pitassi
Leonid Polterovich
Gustavo Ponce
Aleksandr V. Pukhlikov
William R. Pulleyblank
Rolf Rannacher
Idun Reiten
Jeremy Rickard
Aline Robert
Yongbin Ruan
Mikhail V. Safonov
Peter Sarnak
Hans Peter Schlickewei
Roberto H. Schonmann
Alexander Schrijver
Kristian Seip
Vera Serganova
Aner Shalev
Peter Shor
David Siegmund
Karl Sigmund
Neil Sloane
Feodor A. Smirnov
David A. Smith
Hart F. Smith

Ronald J. Stern
James W. Stigler
Jan-Olov Strömberg
Madhu Sudan

Alain-Sol Sznitman
Michel Talagrand
Clifford Taubes
Joseph A. Thas
Stevo Todorčević
Nicole Tomczak-Jaegermann
Lloyd N. Trefethen
Boris Tsirelson
Takeshi Tsuji
Gunther Uhlmann
Cumrun Vafa
Marcelo Viana

Kari Vilonen
Vladimir Voevodsky
Stephen Wainger
Minoru Wakimoto
Emo Welzl
Alex Wilkie
Jan Camiel Willems
Ruth J. Williams
Thomas Hartwig Wolff
Zhihong Xia
Dmitri Yafaev
Horng-Tzer Yau
Andrei Zelevinsky
Shou-Wu Zhang
Joachem Zowe

2002, Beijing

Semyon Alesker
Noga Alon
Luigi Ambrosio
Ben Andrews
Douglas N. Arnold
Sanjeev Arora
Hajer Bahouri
Deborah Loewenberg Ball
Imre Bárány
Robert Bartnik
Gérard Ben Arous
Michael Benedicks
Jean Bertoin
Mladen Bestvina
Philippe Biane
Peter J. Bickel
Stephen Bigelow
Paul Biran
Dietmar Bisch
Aart Blokhuis
Erwin Bolthausen

Umberto Bottazzini
Élisabeth Bouscaren
Hubert Bray
Yann Brenier
Alberto Bressan
Jean Bricmont
Lawrence D. Brown
Luis Caffarelli
Sun-Yung Alice Chang
Yu. V. Chekanov
Jean-Yves Chemin
Mu-Fa Chen
Xiuxioung Chen
Alain Chenciner
James W. Cogdell
Albert Cohen
Henri Cohen
Gérard Cornuéjols
Patrick Delorme
James Demmel
Jan Denef
Weiyue Ding
David Donoho
Jean-Luc Dorier
Michael R. Douglas
Weinan E
Jean-Pierre Eckmann
Moritz Epple
Alexandre Eremenko
Hélène Esnault
Pavel Etingof
Ludvig Faddeev
Uriel Feige
Eduard Feireisl
Bernold Fiedler
Philippe Flajolet
Jean-Marc Fontaine
Giovanni Forni
Dan Freed
Mikio Furuta
Dennis Gaitsgory
Liming Ge
Emmanuel Giroux
Moti Gitik
Shafi Goldwasser
Lothar Göttsche
Lei Guo
Uffe Haagerup
Thomas Hales
Vagn Lunsgaard Hansen
Michael Harris
Juha Heinonen
Lars Hesselholt
Jiaxing Hong
Michael Hopkins
Kentaro Hori
Celia Hoyles
Hesheng Hu
A. Huber
Russell Impagliazzo
Eleny-Nicole Ionel

Svetlana Jitomirskaya
Kurt Johansson
Victor Kac
Gabriele Kaiser
Ravindran Kannan
Nicole El Karoui
Kazuya Kato
Carlos E. Kenig
Harry Kesten

Frances Kirwan
Alexander Klyachko
Toshiyuki Kobayashi
Nancy Kopell
Stephen S. Kudla
Laurent Lafforgue
Vincent Lafforgue
Daniel Lascar
Rafael Latala
Greg Lawler
Nicolas Lerner
Frederick Leung
Marc Levine
Peter Wai-Kwong Li
YanYan Li
Nati Linial
Kefeng Liu
Tai-Ping Liu
Yiming Long
Mitchell Luskin
Vladimir Mazya
Michael Liam McQuillan
Vikram Bhagvandas Mehta
Eckhard Meinrenken

Nitsa Movshovitz-Hadar
Shigeru Mukai
David Mumford
Bruno Nachtergaele
Hiraku Nakajima
Maxim Nazarov
Nikita A. Nekrasov
Masatoshi Noumi
Dmitri Olegovich Orlov
Felix Otto
Rahul Pandharipande
Yuval Peres
Anton Petrunin
Ilya Piatetski-Shapiro
Richard Pink
Agoston Pisztora
Cheryl Praeger
Enrique Pujals
Anjing Qu
Alfio Quarteroni
Rolf Rannacher
Ran Raz
Bruce Reed
Miles Reid
Y. Ritov
Tristan Rivière
Tom Romberg
Xiaochun Rong
Markus Rost
Karl Rubin
Daniel J. Rudolph
Tobias Rydén
Vadim Schechtman
Christoph Schwab
Richard Schwartz
Paul Seidel
Zlil Sela
James Sethian
Freydoon Shahidi

Yum-Tong Siu
John Smillie
Terry Speed
Daniel Spielman
J.T. Stafford
Eitan Tadmor
Dmitry Tamarkin
Daniel Tătaru
Richard Taylor
Peter Teichner
Christoph Thiele
Gang Tian
Ulrike Tillmann
Burt Totaro
Craig A. Tracy
Dmitrii Treschev
Emmanuel Ullmo
Marie-France Vignéras
Schicheng Wang
Xu-Jia Wang
Brian Cabell White
Peter Winkler
Edward Witten
Maciej P. Wojtkowski
W. Hugh Woodin
Trevor Wooley
Sijue Wu
Shutie Xiao
Zhouping Xin
Jia-An Yan

Ofer Zeitouni
Steve Zelditch
Weiping Zhang
Xiangyu Zhou
Günter M. Ziegler
Maciej Zworski

2006, Madrid

Oleg N. Ageev
Ian Agol
Manindra Agrawal
Valery Alexeev
Michèle Artigue
Franck Barthe
Alexander Barvinok
Vitaly Bergelson
Roman Bezrukavnikov
Manjul Bhargava
Stefano Bianchini
Mario Bonk
Vivek Borkar
Jean-Benoît Bost
Mireille Bousquet-Mélou

Stephen P. Boyd
Alexander Braverman
Simon Brendle
Tom Bridgeland
Martin Bridson
Russel E. Caflisch
Emmanuel Candès
Vicent Caselles
Alberto S. Cattaneo
Raphaël Cerf
Ching-Li Chai
Zhiming Chen
Shiu-Yuen Cheng
Yvonne Choquet-Bruhat
Leo Corry
William Crawley-Boevey
Henri Darmon
Rafael de la Llave
Jan de Lange
Ehud de Shalit
Percy Deift
Jean-Pierre Demailly
Amir Dembo
Bernard Derrida
Ronald DeVore
Dmitry Dolgopyat
Peter Donnelly
Rod Downey
Marcus du Sautoy
Ricardo G. Durán
Nira Dyn
Lawrence Ein
Yakov Eliashberg
K. David Elworthy
Oleg Yu. Emanouilov
Jianqing Fan
Kazuhiro Fujiwara

Bert Gerards
Robert Ghrist
Étienne Ghys
François Golse
Martin Grötschel
Tom Graber
Gian Michele Graf
Ben Green
Michael Griebel
Ian Grojnowski

Niccolò Guicciardini
Alice Guionnet
Max Gunzburger
Matthew Gursky
Mark Haiman
Richard S. Hamilton
Guy Henniart
Steve Hofmann
Alexander Holevo
Ko Honda
Jun-Muk Hwang
Hitoshi Ishii
Henryk Iwaniec
Iain M. Johnstone
Vadim Kaloshin
Michael Kapovich
Kazuya Kato
Bernhard Keller

Mikhail Khovanov
Jeong Han Kim
Boáz Klartag
Jon Kleinberg
Bruce Kleiner
Robert V. Kohn
Sergei Konyagin
Bryna Kra
Steven Lalley
François Lalonde
Gérard Laumon

Patrice Le Calvez
Yves Le Jan
Peng Yee Lee
Randall J. LeVeque
David Levermore
Elon Lindenstrauss
Xiaobo Liu
Tomasz Łuczak
Toshiki Mabuchi
Yvon Maday
Ib Madsen
Jean-Michel Maillet
Marcos Marito
Peter McCullagh
Philippe Michel

William Minicozzi II
Yair Minsky
Nicolas Monod
Fabien Morel
Bienvenido Nebres
Itay Neeman
Arkadi Nemirovski
Ngô Bảo Châu
Wiesława Nizioł
Martin Nowak
David Nualart
Yong-Geun Oh
Andrei Okounkov
Kaoru Ono
E.M. Opdam
Konrad Osterwalder
Narutaka Ozawa
Peter Ozsváth
Dominique Picard
Sorin Popa
Mario Pulvirenti
Alfio Quarteroni
Anthony Ralston
Michael Rathjen
Omer Reingold
Igor Rodnianski
Mikael Rørdam
Antonio Ros
Linda Preiss Rothschild
Tim Roughgarden
Raphaël Rouquier
Ronitt Rubinfeld
Imre Z. Ruzsa
Francisco Santos
Mark Sapir
Ovidiu Savin
Thomas Scanlon
William Schmidt
Peter Schneider
Oded Schramm

Sylvia Serfaty
Yehuda Shalom
Michael Shub
Alan Siegel
Christopher Skinner
Stanislav Smirnov
Agata Smoktunowicz

David Soudry
Birgit Speh
T. A. Springer
Olof Staffans
Richard P. Stanley
Emil Straube
Endre Süli
Zoltán Szabó
Stanisław Szarek
Anders Szepessy
Terence Tao
Vladimir Temlyakov
Tomohide Terasoma
Chuu-Lian Terng
Robin Thomas
Simon Thomas
Xavier Tolsa
Luca Trevisan
Neil Trudinger
Yuri Tschinkel
Eric Urban
Juan Luis Vázquez
Arjan Van der Schaft
Vinayak Vatsal
Luis Vega
Juan J. L. Velázquez
Michèle Vergne
Cédric Villani
Karen Vogtmann
Wendelin Werner
Paul Wiegmann
Avi Wigderson

Jaroslaw Wlodarczyk
Hung-Hsi Wu
Guoliang Yu
Anton Zorich
Enrique Zuazua

2010, Hyderabad

Jill Adler
Dorit Aharonov
David Aldous
Marie-Claude Arnaud
Denis Auroux
Artur Avila
Peter Bürgisser
Ellen Baake
Ramachandran Balasubramanian
Paul Balmer
Prakash Belkale
Itai Benjamini
David J Benson
Patrick Bernard
Louis Billera
Alexei Borodin
Arup Bose
Christophe Breuil
Xavier Buff

Probal Chaudhuri
Shuxing Chen
Chong-Qing Cheng
Arnaud Chéritat
Bernardo Cockburn
Fernando Codá Marques
Henry Cohn
Gonzalo Contreras
Jean-Michel Coron
Kevin Costello
Marianna Csörnyei
E.N. Dancer
Camillo De Lellis
Manuel del Pino
Freddy Delbaen
Frank den Hollander
Nils Dencker
Irit Dinur
Cynthia Dwork
Manfred Einsiedler
Anna Erschler
Alex Eskin
Steven Neil Evans
Isabel Fernández
Sergey Fomin
Hélène Frankowska
Jixiang Fu
Hillel Furstenberg
Nicola Fusco
David Gabai
Damien Gaboriau
Sara van de Geer
William Goldman
Iain Gordon
Ralph Greenberg
Jesper Grodal
Venkatesan Guruswami
Larry Guth
Christopher Hacon
Ursula Hamenstädt
Roger Heath-Brown
Thomas J.R. Hughes
Michael Hutchings
Daniel Huybrechts
Alexander R. Its
Sergei Ivanov
Satoru Iwata
Masaki Izumi

Peter Jones

Anton Kapustin
Nikita Karpenko
Kiran Kedlaya
Carlos Kenig
Chandrashekhar Khare
Subhash Khot
Mark Kisin
Tinne Hoff Kjeldsen
Pekka Koskela
Arno Kuijlaars
Shrawan Kumar
Karl Kunisch
Antti Kupiainen
Wolfgang Lück
Marc Lackenby

Erez Lapid
Yoram Last
Bernard Leclerc
Chiu-Chu Melissa Liu
Ivan Losev
Jacob Lurie
Xiaonan Ma
Philip K. Maini
Matilde Marcolli

Gaven Martin
Vieri Mastropietro
Brendan McKay
James McKernan
Pablo Mira
Maryam Mirzakhani
Justin Tatch Moore
Sophie Morel
Alexander Nabutovsky 

Assaf Naor
Fedor Nazarov
Jaroslav Nešetřil
Yurii Nesterov
Claudia Neuhauser
Ngô Bảo Châu
Andre Nies
Ricardo Horatio Nochetto
Hee Oh
Stanley Osher
Frank Pacard
Raman Parimala
Jongil Park
Pablo A. Parrilo
A.N. Parshin
Mihai Paun
Peng Shige

Kim Plofker
Jeremy Quastel
Eric Rains
Zinovy Reichstein
Idun Reiten
Nicolai Reshetikhin
Oliver Riordan
Federico Rodriguez Hertz
Mark Rudelson

Takeshi Saito
Omri Sarig
Norbert Schappacher
Richard Schoen
Frank-Olaf Schreyer
Christof Schuette
Gregory Seregin
Nimish A. Shah
Qi-Man Shao
Alexander Shapiro
Scott Sheffield
Zuowei Shen
Dimitri Shlyakhtenko

Mikhail Sodin
Kannan Soundararajan
Daniel Spielman
Herbert Spohn
Vasudevan Srinivas
Sergei Starchenko
Andrys Stipsicz
Catharina Stroppel
Benny Sudakov
Suresh Venapally
Richard Thomas
Tatiana Toro
Nizar Touzi
Dmitry Turaev
Salil Vadhan
Stefaan Vaes
Benno Van Dalen
Aad Van der Vaart
S. R. Srinivasa Varadhan
T. N. Venkataramana
Akshay Venkatesh
Roman Vershynin
Claire Voisin
Robert Weismantel

Katrin Wendland
Mary Wheeler
Amie Wilkinson
Jean-Pierre Wintenberger
W. Hugh Woodin
Jinchao Xu
Zongben Xu
Takao Yamaguchi
Xu Zhang
Xunyu Zhou

2014, Seoul

Rémi Abgrall

Ian Agol
Anton Alekseev
Nicolás Andruskiewitsch
Konstantin Ardakov
James Arthur

Viviane Baladi
Weizhu Bao
Boaz Barak
Kai Behrend
Mikhail Belolipetsky
Georgia Benkart
Yves Benoist
Manjul Bhargava
Olivier Biquard
Alexei Borodin
Andrea Braides
Mark Braverman
Emmanuel Breuillard
Franco Brezzi

Jonathan Brundan
Annalisa Buffa
Andrei Bulatov

Emmanuel Candès
Sourav Chatterjee
Zoé Chatzidakis
Luigi Chierchia
Demetrios Christodoulou
Maria Chudnovsky
Julia Chuzhoy
David Conlon
Guillermo Cortinas
Ivan Corwin

Mihalis Dafermos
Panagiota Daskalopoulos
Bertrand Duplantier
Yalchin Efendiev
Friedrich Eisenbrand
Matthew Emerton
Michael Entov

Bertrand Eynard
Fuquan Fang
Ilijas Farah
Benson Farb
Albert Fathi
Alessio Figalli
Vladimir Fock
Jacob Fox
Alan M. Frieze
Alexander Furman
Søren Galatius
Isabelle Gallagher
Wee Teck Gan
Craig Gentry
Anton Gerasimov
Étienne Ghys
Anna C. Gilbert
Daniel Goldston
Ben Green
Geoffrey Grimmett
Mark Gross
Robert Guralnick
Seung-Yeal Ha
Martin Hairer
Michael Harris
Harald Helfgott
Michael Hill
Nancy Hingston
Kengo Hirachi
Jun-Muk Hwang

Robert Jerrard
Jeremy Kahn
Seok-Jin Kang
Martin Kassabov
Nets Katz
Rinat Kedem
Olga Kharlampovich
Bumsig Kim
Byunghan Kim
Alexander Kleshchev
János Kollár
Michael Krivelevich
Daniela Kühn
Takashi Kumagai
Alexander Kuznetsov
Izabella Łaba
Kenneth Lange
Monique Laurent
Jean-François Le Gall
Michel Ledoux
Ki-Ahm Lee
Adrian Lewis
Tao Li
Chang-Shou Lin
François Loeser
Russell Lyons
Terry Lyons
Mikhail Lyubich
Andrea Malchiodi
Adam W. Marcus
Jens Marklof
Vladimir Markovic
Fernando Codá Marques

Robert J. McCann
Frank Merle
Alexei Miasnikov
John Milnor
Maryam Mirzakhani
Takurō Mochizuki
Antonio Montalbán
Carlos Gustavo Moreira

Mircea Mustaţă

André Neves
Barbara Niethammer
Marc Noy
Ryan O'Donnell
Keiji Oguiso
Grigori Olshanski
Hinke Osinga
Deryk Osthus
Victor Ostrik
Yaron Ostrover
János Pach
Sandrine Péché
Benoit Perthame
Jonathan Pila
János Pintz
Gabriella Pinzari
Jill Pipher
Mark Pollicott
Han Qi
Pierre Raphael
Andrei S. Rapinchuk
Batmanathan Dayanand Reddy
Bertrand Rémy
Nicolas Ressayre
Charles Rezk
Hans Ringström
Luc Robbiano
Vojtěch Rödl
John Rognes
Pierre Rouchon
Zeev Rudnick
Laure Saint-Raymond
Tom Sanders
Thomas Schick
Wilhelm Schlag
Peter Scholze
Robert Seiringer
Timo Seppäläinen
Vera Serganova
Nataša Šešum
Samson Shatashvili
Weixiao Shen
Chi-Wang Shu
Vladas Sidoravicius
Bernd Siebert

Luis Silvestre
Karen E. Smith
Sasha Sodin
Slawomir Solecki
Roland Speicher
Daniel Spielman
Nikhil Srivastava
Angelika Steger
Andrew Stuart

Gábor Székelyhidi

Denis Talay

Jörg Teschner
Yukinobu Toda
Bertrand Toën
Peter Topping
Dominique Tournes
Masato Tsujii
Alexandre Tsybakov
Sebastian van Strien
Michela Varagnolo
Éric Vasserot
András Vasy
Mikhail Verbitsky
Bálint Virág
Van H. Vu
Martin Wainwright
Jean-Loup Waldspurger
Juncheng Wei
Stefan Wenger
Ryan Williams
Daniel Wise
Trevor Wooley
Sergey Yekhanin
Cem Yıldırım
Jiongmin Yong
Shih-Hsien Yu
Ya-xiang Yuan
Umberto Zannier
Thaleia Zariphopoulou
Yitang Zhang
Günter M. Ziegler
Tamar Ziegler

2018, Rio de Janeiro

Dan Abramovich
Andris Ambainis
Luigi Ambrosio
Nalini Anantharaman

Yves André
Tomoyuki Arakawa
Carolina Araujo
Spiros Argyros
Sanjeev Arora
Matthias Aschenbrenner
László Babai
József Balogh
Arthur Bartels
Alexander Belavin
Nicolas Bergeron
Bo Berndtsson
Andrea Bertozzi
Caucher Birkar
Christopher J. Bishop
Jairo Bochi
Marianna Bosch
Sem Borst
Sébastien Boucksom
Paul Bourgade

Peter Bühlmann
Raimund Bürger
Serge Cantat
Lucia Caporaso
Manuel Castro
Dmitry Chelkak
Jungkai Alfred Chen
Meng Chen
Ronald Coifman
Diego Córdoba

Jean-Marc Delort
Laura DeMarco

Lorenzo J. Díaz
Simon Donaldson
Lou van den Dries
Qiang Du
Hugo Duminil-Copin
Tobias Ekholm
Selim Esedoglu
María J. Esteban
Ruy Exel
Mouhamed Moustapha Fall
Bassam Fayad
Laurent Fargues
Michael Finkelberg
Philippe Di Francesco
Koji Fujiwara

Josselin Garnier
Christof Geiß
Tsachik Gelander
Yoshikazu Giga
Mike Giles
Catherine Goldstein
Sébastien Gouezel
Massimiliano Gubinelli
Colin Guillarmou
Paul Hacking
Richard Haydon
Xuhua He
Joris van der Hoeven
Michael Hochman
Umberto Hryniewicz
June Huh
Piotr Indyk
Adrian Ioana
Adrian Iovita
Osamu Iyama
Pierre-Emmanuel Jabin
Stephen Jackson
Richard James
Shi Jin
Bill Johnson
Bernardo Uribe Jongbloed
Michael I. Jordan
Gil Kalai
Yael Tauman Kalai
Noureddine El Karoui
Rinat Kashaev
Fanny Kassel
Neeraj Kayal
Yasuyuki Kawahigashi
Sean Keel
Peter Keevash
Richard Kenyon

Jong Hae Keum
Konstantin Khanin
Alexander Kiselev

Ulrich Kohlenbach
Vladimir Koltchinskii
Andrés Koropecki

Peter B. Kronheimer

Krzysztof Kurdyka
Vincent Lafforgue

Matti Lassas

Greg Lawler
Elizaveta Levina
Robert Lipshitz
Carlangelo Liverani
Alexander Logunov
Helena J. Nussenzveig Lopes
Christian Lubich
Alexander Lubotzky

Mohamed Majdoub
Eugenia Malinnikova
Maryanthe Malliaris
Ciprian Manolescu
Yvan Martel
Nader Masmoudi
András Mathé
Kaisa Matomäki
James Maynard
Svitlana Mayboroda
Jason P. Miller
Siddhartha Mishra
Mahan Mj

Andrea Montanari
Carlos Gustavo Moreira
Robert Morris
Clément Mouhot
Tomasz Mrowka
Ritabrata Munshi
Emmy Murphy
Assaf Naor
Meysam Nassiri
Sonia Natale
Andrés Navas
András Némethi

Andrei Okounkov
Denis Osin
Igor Pak
Rahul Pandharipande
Ivan Panin
Georgios Pappas
John Pardon
Byeong Park
Stefanie Petermichl
Mamokgethi Phakeng
Guido De Philippis
Vincent Pilloni

Alexei Poltoratski
Bjorn Poonen
Mihnea Popa
Alexander Postnikov
Rafael Potrie
Dipendra Prasad

Luis Radford
Maksym Radziwill
Prasad Raghavendra
Alan Reid
Benjamin Rossman

David E. Rowe
Claudia Sagastizábal
Pedro Salomão
Wojciech Samotij
Sucharit Sarkar
Olivier Schiffmann

Peter Scholze
Sylvia Serfaty
Mariya Shcherbina
Amit Singer
Allan Sly
Ivan Smith
David Steurer
Song Sun
Balázs Szegedy

Tao Tang
Gábor Tardos
Jonathan Taylor
Andreas Thom
Rekha R. Thomas
Jack Thorne
Dinh Tien-Cuong
Pham Huu Tiep
Philippe Toint
Fabio Toninelli
Anna-Karin Tornberg
Bálint Tóth
Emmanuel Trélat
Jacob Tsimerman
Virginia Vassilevska Williams
Akshay Venkatesh
Maryna Viazovska
Eva Viehmann
Miguel Walsh
Simone Warzel
Anna Wienhard
Geordie Williamson
Thomas Willwacher
Wilhelm Winter
Barbara Wohlmuth
Nick Wormald
Chenyang Xu
Jiangong You
Lai-Sang Young
Zhiwei Yun
Pingwen Zhang
Wei Zhang

Most invited
This list inventories the mathematicians who were the most invited to speak to an ICM.

References

See also
 Plenary Speakers , contribution titles, and URLs
 International Mathematical Union: Proceedings 1893-2014

External links

International Congress of Mathematicians
International Congress of Mathematicians